David Davison (born between April and June 1916) was an English footballer who played as a goalkeeper, later becoming a manager. He played for Chelmsford City and Blackburn Rovers. After the war he coached Heracles Almelo in the Netherlands and Bayern Munich in Germany.

In March 1939 David Davison transferred as a 22 year old for a fee of £500 from Southern League side Chelmsford City to the Football League Second Division club Blackburn Rovers. Before Davison's time at Chelmsford City, he had played for Bolton Wanderers, Kingstonian and the old Chelmsford amateur club.

After the war he was coaching the football team of the British forces in Germany. In July 1948, then aged 34, he was given the coaching position of Heracles Almelo, a club of the eastern division of the Dutch First Division where he succeeded player-coach Koldewey (who in turn was the successor of Leslie Lievesley who died as manager of Il Grande Torino at the Superga plane crash). In February 1949 he was sacked after an altercation with the ground-keeper, after the club had felt unhappy with his achievements anyway. Heracles finished the season as third of its league.

In summer 1950 he was hired by Bayern Munich as successor to Alv Riemke. In November the club was just a couple of points outside the relegation zone of the Oberliga Süd, the southern division of Germany's highest football tier, and Davison was found out to have been involved in a pub brawl. As a consequence he was fired. Bayern finished the league as ninth. After interim solutions with former players and a player-manager, Max Schäfer, up to then with local rivals TSV 1860 Munich, became Bayern's manager for the 1951/52 season.

References

Bolton Wanderers F.C. players
Kingstonian F.C. players
Chelmsford City F.C. players
Blackburn Rovers F.C. players
Heracles Almelo managers
FC Bayern Munich managers
Expatriate football managers in Germany
English expatriate sportspeople in Germany
Expatriate football managers in the Netherlands
English expatriate sportspeople in the Netherlands
Association football goalkeepers
English footballers
English football managers
English expatriate football managers
Association football coaches
1916 births
Possibly living people